Chandigarh Transport Undertaking (CTU) is the public transport unit of the Chandigarh administration in India. It is managed by the Home Secretary, who acts as transport secretary and director. It operates a mixed fleet of AC, non AC, mini, midi, and Corona low floor buses. Almost all the buses have digital display and the routes, time of arrival, and stops of the buses can be found in the CTU Bus Guide app for Android phones.

History
Chandigarh Transport Undertaking came into existence on 01.11.1966 with a fleet of 30 buses, as a result of trifurcation of Punjab Roadways at the time of re-organisation of Punjab State.

Fleet

CTU has 603buses, out of which 436 buses serve the Chandigarh region. The remaining 167 run on interstate routes covering Punjab, Himachal, Uttar Pradesh, Uttarakhand, Rajasthan, Delhi, Haryana and Jammu and Kashmir.

SMS Based and IVRS system is installed for queries for estimated times of arrival of buses.

Chandigarh CTU Local Bus Routes and Timings

References

Transport in Chandigarh
State road transport corporations of India
Indian companies established in 1966
Companies based in Chandigarh
1966 establishments in Chandigarh
Transport companies established in 1966